Eugene Martin Nugent (born 21 October 1958) is an Irish Roman Catholic prelate who has served as Apostolic Nuncio to Bahrain, Kuwait and Qatar since January 2021.

Early life and education

Nugent was born in Gurtaderra, Scariff, County Clare on 21 October 1958.

He attended primary school at Clonusker National School and secondary school at Scariff Community College. Nugent studied for the priesthood at St Patrick's College, Maynooth, where he was awarded a Bachelor of Arts in Celtic studies from the National University of Ireland, and the Pontifical Irish College, Rome, where he was awarded a baccalaureate in theology from the Pontifical Gregorian University.

Nugent was ordained a priest for the Diocese of Killaloe on 9 July 1983.

Presbyteral ministry

Following ordination, Nugent completed a licentiate in canon law at the Pontifical Gregorian University, before returning to the Diocese of Killaloe in 1984, where he received his first pastoral assignment as curate in the cathedral parish in Ennis until 1987.

Nugent returned to Rome in 1988, where he worked in the Section for General Affairs of the Secretariat of State, before entering the Pontifical Ecclesiastical Academy in 1991, in preparation for a diplomatic career for the Holy See. He was awarded a doctorate in canon law from the Pontifical Gregorian University in 1992.

Upon completion of studies at the Pontifical Ecclesiastical Academy, Nugent entered the diplomatic service of the Holy See on 1 July 1992, with his first diplomatic appointment as secretary to the Apostolic Nunciature to Turkey, Israel and Palestine. He was subsequently appointed to the Apostolic Nunciature to the Philippines in 2000, but while he was officially assigned to the apostolic nunciature in Manila, he resided in Hong Kong, from where he led the Holy See Study Mission. During his mission, Nugent handled relations between Catholic communities in China and the Holy See, however his effectiveness in doing so was compromised by the refusal of the Beijing government to allow him to travel regularly to mainland China, resulting in relations often being maintained in secret.

Episcopal ministry

Apostolic Nuncio to Madagascar, Mauritius and Seychelles 
Nugent was appointed Apostolic Nuncio to Madagascar, Apostolic Delegate to Comoros and Réunion and titular archbishop of Domnach Sechnaill by Pope Benedict XVI on 13 February 2010. He was also appointed Apostolic Nuncio to Mauritius and Seychelles on 13 March.

Nugent was consecrated by the Cardinal Secretary of State, Tarcisio Bertone, on 18 March in St Peter's Basilica, Rome.

Apostolic Nuncio to Haiti 
Nugent was appointed Apostolic Nuncio to Haiti by Pope Francis on 10 January 2015. He championed many causes during his mission, including the reconstruction of churches following the 2010 earthquake to facilitating political dialogue in order to end the political crisis in the country.

Apostolic Nuncio to Bahrain, Kuwait and Qatar 
Nugent was appointed Apostolic Nuncio to Kuwait and Qatar by Pope Francis on 7 January 2021.

He was also appointed Apostolic Nuncio to Bahrain on 11 February.

Notes

See also
 List of heads of the diplomatic missions of the Holy See

References

External links

 Archbishop Eugene Martin Nugent on Catholic-Hierarchy.org
 Archbishop Eugene Martin Nugent on GCatholic

Living people
1958 births
Irish Roman Catholic titular bishops
Apostolic Nuncios to Madagascar
Roman Catholic titular archbishops
Alumni of St Patrick's College, Maynooth
Pontifical Gregorian University alumni
Pontifical Ecclesiastical Academy alumni
20th-century Roman Catholics
Pontifical Irish College alumni
Diplomats of the Holy See
21st-century Roman Catholics
People from County Clare
Apostolic Nuncios to Haiti
Apostolic Nuncios to Seychelles
Apostolic Nuncios to Kuwait
Apostolic Nuncios to Qatar
Apostolic Nuncios to Bahrain
Irish Roman Catholic archbishops